Donald G. Ingalls (July 29, 1918 – March 10, 2014) was an American screenwriter and television producer. He was a lifelong friend of Gene Roddenberry, having served in the Los Angeles Police Department with him.

Early life
Don Ingalls was born in Humboldt, Nebraska on July 29, 1918. During the Second World War, Ingalls was in the United States Army Air Forces as a pilot. He was stationed in Europe, flying Boeing B-17 Flying Fortresses. Following the war, he subsequently became a test pilot for North American Aviation.

Ingalls became a police officer and worked under Chief William H. Parker in the Los Angeles Police Department within the Public Information department. It was in the police that he met lifelong friend Gene Roddenberry for the first time, and both of them transitioned from the Newspaper Unit within the Traffic Department to the new section when Parker was made chief. The pair shared a common background, both of them having been B-17 pilots during the war. During this time, they worked from a single office on the 27th floor of the Los Angeles City Hall. The duo shared a desire to become writers, with Ingalls being the first between them to resign from the LAPD to pursue this objective.

Screenwriting career
Roddenberry and Ingalls drifted apart following the latter's resignation, but reunited early on in their writing careers. Roddenberry was initially the more successful of the two, and recommended Ingalls as story editor to Sam Rolfe on the television series Have Gun – Will Travel. He would also continue to recommend Ingalls for other screenwriting jobs around the same time, while Ingalls went on to become an associate producer at Have Gun – Will Travel. When Roddenberry began to develop Star Trek, he sent Ingalls a series outline but asked him to keep it "very, very confidential".

Ingalls went on to write two scripts for Star Trek, his first being "The Alternative Factor". His second script, "A Private Little War", was intended to be a criticism piece on the Vietnam War, but was heavily re-written by Roddenberry to the extent that Ingalls was angry at him for a year and insisted on being credited only under the pseudonym "Jud Crucis".

He wrote episodes for a variety of television series, and was a producer on shows such as Fantasy Island, T.J. Hooker and Kingston: Confidential. Ingalls also wrote a handful of television movies such as the 1979 Captain America film. He has a single theatrical film credit, Airport 1975 (1974). His final work was the novel, Watchers on the Mountain (2005) a fictional work about the Navajo Nation.

Death
He died in 2014 after a long illness at his home in Olympia, Washington.

Filmography

Films

Television

Notes

References

External links
 

1918 births
2014 deaths
People from Humboldt, Nebraska
21st-century American novelists
American science fiction writers
American television writers
Los Angeles Police Department officers
American male television writers
United States Army Air Forces officers
United States Army Air Forces pilots of World War II
21st-century American male writers
Screenwriters from Nebraska
21st-century American screenwriters